Orion Academy is a private high school in Concord, California, United States, for students with Asperger's syndrome, nonverbal learning disorder (NLD), and other neurocognitive disabilities.  It offers a special education college preparatory program for grades 9-12.

The school maintains a staff-to-student ratio of 1:4 with an average class size of eight.  Over 90% of its graduates attend college or post-secondary training. In 2010, there were 80 students enrolled in total. In 2017, there were 44 currently enrolled students.

History
Orion Academy is accredited by the Western Association of Schools and Colleges (WASC), has a 180-day curriculum, and is approved as a nonpublic school by the State of California.

Kathryn Stewart, Ph.D., is Orion Academy's Executive Director. In 1988, Sue Thompson, Judy Lewis, and Kathy Allen, all involved with nonverbal learning disorder, met with Stewart to ask her to set up a school for students with NLD or Asperger's syndrome. They introduced Stewart to Aaron and Val Simon, parents of a child with Asperger's syndrome who were interested in funding a school. With funding from the Simons, after two years of planning meetings, Orion Academy welcomed its first eight students taught by four teachers in September 2000. By June 2001, there were twelve students.

In 2021, Orion Academy relocated from Moraga, California to its current location in Concord.

Offerings 
Orion Academy has teachers in language arts, math, science, special education, social science, and social skills.

More than 35 college preparatory courses are offered to approximately 60 students with a staff including 20 professionals in total. Extracurricular activities include chess club, student council, a travel program, and a track team. Orion-specific activities include the Dog Program, an occupational therapy class, a mandatory personal project class, social skills groups, laptop computers as a basis of all work done by students, mandated volunteer experiences, and internship opportunities.

References

External links 
 

Asperger syndrome
High schools in Contra Costa County, California
Private high schools in California
Special schools in the United States